The State Museum for Nature and Man (in German: Landesmuseum für Natur und Mensch) is a natural history, ethnology, and  archaeology museum in the city of Oldenburg, Lower Saxony, Germany.

The museum was opened in 1836 as Oldenburg's first natural history museum by Grand Duke Paul Friedrich August. It moved to its current location in 1880. The museum presents collections of archaeology, ethnology, and natural museum, in permanent interdisciplinary exhibits, together with an aquarium. The building is southwest of the Schlossgarten Oldenburg. Further museums to the northwest include the Augusteum, the Prinzenpalais, and Schloss Oldenburg.

See also
List of visitor attractions in Oldenburg

References

External links

 Museum website

1836 establishments in Germany
Buildings and structures completed in 1879
Museums established in 1836
Buildings and structures in Oldenburg (city)
Tourist attractions in Oldenburg (city)
Museums in Lower Saxony
Natural history museums in Germany
Ethnographic museums in Germany
Archaeological museums in Germany
Aquaria in Germany
Classicist architecture in Germany